H. H. Warner Building is a historic office building located at Rochester in Monroe County, New York. It is a large, seven-story commercial building built in 1883–1884.  It is constructed of load-bearing brick walls, a cast-iron vault, timber framework, and a cast-iron facade on St. Paul St. Originally built to house a patent medicine laboratory and warehouse, it now houses retail and apartments. The building has a Venetian Gothic style.

It was listed on the National Register of Historic Places in 1985.

References

Commercial buildings in Rochester, New York
Commercial buildings on the National Register of Historic Places in New York (state)
Office buildings completed in 1884
National Register of Historic Places in Rochester, New York